Għasri Valley is a sea canyon on the Maltese island of Gozo. The gorge continues on the land towards the village of Għasri. The sea is only accessible via a narrow cove with high cliffs on both sides. On the edge of the valley, next to an underwater cave, it is commonly believed that Maltese salt pans were built and maintained.
It contains a secluded beach which is popular with tourists and divers alike.

History 
In the 18th century, the inner part of Wied il-Għasri was owned by a Maltese clockmaker who decided to dig a well in a cave entrance in the sea, creating what is known today as Għar il-Qamħ.

References 

Gozo
Valleys of Malta